Chuqu Chuquni (Aymara chuqu chuqu icicle, -ni a suffix, "the one with many icicles", hispanicized spelling Chojochojone) is a mountain in the Andes of Peru, about  high. It is located in the Puno Region, El Collao Province, Santa Rosa District.

References

Mountains of Puno Region
Mountains of Peru